Bethan Elfyn is a Welsh radio and television presenter.

Elfyn was born in Bangor, Gwynedd, was brought up in Newtown, Powys, and now lives in Cardiff with her husband, Clwb Ifor Bach Promoter and Works Manager Richard Hawkins. They had a daughter, Tegan, in February 2012, and a second daughter in December 2016.

Elfyn is a fluent Welsh speaker and has appeared as a panellist on Welsh-language channel S4C's music talent show Wawffactor. She co-hosted Radio 1's first Welsh-language programme as part of the oneclick strand in August 2005 with Aled Haydn-Jones from The Chris Moyles Show.

Elfyn co-presented the Wales programme on BBC Radio 1 with Huw Stephens as part of the station's regional output every Thursday evening. She joined Radio 1 in 1999 during the Cool Cymru era of music and arts popularity, as part of the aforementioned new regional output, and left in 2010 after 11 years at the station.

She currently presents the Saturday evening show for BBC Radio Wales on the current Welsh music scene, with live sessions, interviews and a mix of classic rock and pop. Elfyn also presents The Bethan Elfyn Show on Amazing Radio where she features a range of music from new and emerging artists. She also appears occasionally on BBC 6 Music as cover for presenters including Lauren Laverne.

Elfyn is also one of the architects of the BBC/Wales Arts Council programme Horizons Gorwelion, supporting new Welsh bands. The programme was established in 2014.

References

External links
Bethan Elfyn (BBC Radio Wales)

British radio DJs
Living people
People from Bangor, Gwynedd
Cool Cymru
Welsh television presenters
Welsh women television presenters
Welsh radio presenters
Welsh women radio presenters
Place of birth missing (living people)
Year of birth missing (living people)
BBC Radio Wales presenters